Peter Harlow Raymond (born January 21, 1947) is a beekeeper, and an American former rower who competed in the 1968 Summer Olympics and in the 1972 Summer Olympics.  He was born in Princeton, New Jersey and attended South Kent School and Princeton University.

In 1968, he was stroke of the American boat which finished fifth in the coxless four event.
Four years later, he rowed #6 in the silver medal American eight in the 1972 eights competition.
From 1974–85 he served as editor of The U. S. Rowing Association's magazineThe Oarsman which became the Rowing U.S.A. He was First Violin with the C.R.A.S.H.-B Marching Chamber Orchestra 1982–86. He is a writer and English teacher at Noble and Greenough school.

See also
 List of Princeton University Olympians

References

1947 births
Living people
American male rowers
Olympic silver medalists for the United States in rowing
People from Princeton, New Jersey
Princeton University alumni
Rowers at the 1968 Summer Olympics
Rowers at the 1972 Summer Olympics
South Kent School alumni
Medalists at the 1972 Summer Olympics